Fouad "Hoss" Abiad (born 15 October 1978) is a retired Canadian IFBB professional bodybuilder and owner of Hosstile. Abiad, of Lebanese heritage, began training at the age of 21. He credits his father as his biggest influence. Abiad is a Muslim.

Contest history

2006
Canadian National Championships - Overall Champion
IFBB Atlantic Pro - Open, 15th

2007
IFBB Montreal Pro - Open, 5th
IFBB Atlantic City - Open, 8th

2008
IFBB Europa Supershow - Open, 3rd
IFBB Houston Pro Invitational - Open, 7th
IFBB Tampa Bay Pro - Open, 5th
IFBB Mr. Olympia - Open, 17th

2011 
Arnold Sports Festival|Arnold Classic - Open, 12th
IFBB Flex Pro - Open, 3rd

2012 
IFBB Flex Pro - Open, 3rd
Arnold Classic - Open, 11th

2013 
Arnold Classic - Open, 10th
IFBB Toronto Pro - Open, 2nd

2014 
IFBB Europa Supershow - Open, 2nd

2015 
IFBB Europa Supershow - Open, 1st
IFBB Vancouver Pro - Open, 1st
IFBB Tampa Pro - Open, 2nd

2016 
IFBB Toronto Pro - Open, 3rd

2017 
Arnold Classic - Open, 6th

References

 Contest History

External links 
 Fouad Abiad

Canadian bodybuilders
Sportspeople from Windsor, Ontario
1978 births
Living people
Canadian people of Lebanese descent
Sportspeople of Lebanese descent